A waist bag, or fanny pack (American English), belt bag, moon bag, belly bag (American English), or bumbag (British English) is a small fabric pouch worn like a belt around the waist by use of a strap above the hips that is secured usually with some sort of buckle. The straps sometimes have tri-glide slides, making them adjustable in order to fit properly. It can be considered as a purse worn around the waist.

Although traditionally the bag was worn with the pouch at the front, the separate American and British names derive from the fact that they are often worn with the pouch above the buttocks, for which "fanny"  and "bum" are respective slang terms in each country.

Early usage
Historically, the bag was positioned in front of the body, so people could protect themselves from bandits. Bags attached to belts have been in use since antiquity in many cultures.  One origin was the Native American buffalo pouch which was used instead of sewing pockets into clothing. Buffalo pouches may also be worn on the wrist or carried on the front of the chest via a neck strap or lanyard. Ötzi had a belt pouch 5000 years ago. The European medieval belt-pouch is another antecedent which was superseded as clothing came to have pockets. The Scottish sporran is a similar belted pouch that survived because of the impracticality of pockets in a kilt.

1950s and later
In 1954, a skiers leather fanny pack appeared in a Sports Illustrated Christmas shopping guide:
"$10. The lightweight leather 'fanny pack' is designed to hold a cross-country skier's wax and lunch. It's also useful for cyclists, hikers, equestrians."

In 1962, reportedly, Melba Stone, an Australian widow, inspired by a kangaroo, is sometimes credited with making a fanny pack.

"In 1988, Adweek named the fanny pack the product of the year."— i-D

The modern version made from nylon and other synthetic materials came into use in the 1980s and they were especially in vogue in the 1990s, but gradually their use fell into decline in the 2000s. Their use was satirised by the American humorist Weird Al Yankovic in his song White & Nerdy.

Mobile devices (and USB charging cables and backup batteries), bottles of water, snacks, tissue paper, first aid, isopropyl alcohol, contact lenses, and pepper spray are among some of the most common items stored in the bag. Fanny packs designed for concealed carry of a weapon are available.

In other cultures, they are known as banana bags (in France) and kidney bags (in Spain), while in Italy it is called the marsupio, from the marsupium. In Costa Rica, this kind of bag is called a Skippy or canguru, from the TV series Skippy the Kangaroo. Variations include the wristpack, which is essentially a fanny pack for the wrist.

Unlike handbags, they do not have to be carried, and unlike backpacks, they do not put undue strain on the back. Often referred to as "waist bags", they tend to be worn "cross body" rather than around the waist. Fashion houses such as Chanel and Gucci are at the forefront of the trend. The practicality of fanny packs is particularly popular in "festival fashion", where outfits tend to be more extravagant.

Couture fashion
In 2012, calling them "belted satchels" or "hands-free bags", several designer labels sought to bring the accessory back by offering stylish and expensive designs selling for as much as $1995.

In July 2018, The Boston Globe reported that fanny packs are back in vogue with new packs introduced by fashion designers Gucci, Prada, and Louis Vuitton. The designer packs retail for up to $1500 and are being worn by celebrities such as Kim Kardashian, Rihanna, Jaden Smith, and Russell Westbrook. This time around, the packs can be worn around the waist or worn cross-body. Vogue magazine reported on the trend by writing "Alas, due to our odd fascination with ugly throwback clothing, the fanny pack has been vindicated."

Gallery

See also
 Money belt
 Sporran, a pouch that functions like a pocket for kilt-wearers
 Back pack
 Messenger bag, a larger pouch than a fanny pack
 Utility belt

References

Travel gear
Bags (fashion)
Belts (clothing)
1990s fashion
1990s fads and trends
2010s fads and trends

de:Tasche#Bauchtasche